No Mercy, No Remorse is the second studio album by American rapper RBX, released June 29, 1999 on Street Solid Records. It was produced entirely by Polarbear. The album features guest appearances by Treach of Naughty By Nature and Swedish hip hop group, Infinite Mass.

This release is a fusion between two of RBX's EPs on one CD. Tracks 1 to 7 are from No Mercy, No Remorse and tracks 8 to 14 are from The X-Factor. Track 15 is an untitled hidden track.

Reception 

Allmusic - "Four years after his debut album, The RBX Files, RBX resurfaced on Street Solid with his sophomore effort, No Mercy, No Remorse/The X-Factor. While a four-year wait between albums wouldn't be as big of a deal in jazz, blues, pop, or country, it's an eternity in hip-hop -- a genre in which trends and tastes can change radically in the course of a few years. And when you consider that the release of The RBX Files was delayed a few years because of RBX's problems with Dr. Dre in the early 1990s, you're really talking more than a four-year gap between albums. But delays and all, RBX's rapping style still sounds quite fresh on this 1999 CD...No Mercy, No Remorse/The X-Factor is a respectable, long overdue follow-up from an MC who should have recorded a lot more often in the 1990s."

Track listing

References

External links 
 No Mercy, No Remorse at Discogs

RBX albums
1999 albums
Gangsta rap albums by American artists
G-funk albums